This article provides details of international football games played by the Indonesia national football team from 1950 to 1979.

Results

1951

1953

1954

1956

1957

1958

1959

1960

1961

1962

1963

1964

1965

1966

1967

1968

1969

1970

1971

1972

1973

1974

1975

1976

1977

1978

1979

References

1950
1950s in Indonesian sport
1960s in Indonesian sport
1970s in Indonesian sport